Prunay is a commune in the Marne department in north-eastern France. An important pottery vase with La Tène decoration dating to between 400-350 BC was found in the commune. Known as the Prunay Vase, it is now in the British Museum's collection.

See also
Communes of the Marne department

Gallery

References 

Communes of Marne (department)